Johan Brunström and Raven Klaasen were the defending champions, but Brunström chose not to participate this year.  Klaasen played alongside Eric Butorac, but lost in the first round to Andre Begemann and Robin Haase.

Martin Kližan and Philipp Oswald won the title, defeating Rohan Bopanna and Aisam-ul-Haq Qureshi in the final, 6–2, 6–0.

Seeds

Draw

Draw

External links
 Main draw

Doubles